An important part of the counterculture of the 1970s, Project One, sometimes described as a technological commune, was an intentional community in San Francisco, California, U.S. Located at 1380 Howard St. in an 84,000 square foot warehouse, formerly an abandoned candy factory, the community functioned from 1970 to 1980 and was the first "warehouse community" in San Francisco. Occupied by a shifting mix of students, craftspeople, artisans, sculptors, filmmakers, and technologists, Project One was anchored by a number of organizations.

The community had no formal organizational structure. Decisions were made through a voluntary weekly meeting of members who made decisions based on a consensus of those present.

Project One was initiated by architect Ralph Scott, a former student of Buckminster Fuller, and rapidly became an interdisciplinary learning environment. Central to the concept was Symbas Alternative High School, founded by Scott and located in a large, high-ceiling space on the first floor. Many of these resident non-profit organizations and small businesses were brought in to serve as resources for the students, who were also members of the larger community. Students found mentors who offered skills training and the opportunities to practice new skills.    See also community of place.

Construction
When this abandoned, 84,000 sq. ft. warehouse was first leased in 1970, all previous internal walls and structures had been removed from the basement, four full floors and penthouse. It was completely empty except for the structural supporting columns that held the four stories up. The building was constructed with steel reinforced concrete. When it was first occupied, the people who lived and worked there designed and built all the walls, hallways, work and living spaces as well as the electrical and plumbing systems.  As not all had previous skills in construction and remodeling there was a lot of on-the-job training, reflecting a strong do-it-yourself ethic which was common in the counterculture. Since there were a wide variety of skills available within the community, it was rarely necessary to hire outside contractors.

Anchor Organizations

Airwaves
Principals:  Larry Bensky, Barry Kearson (aka Barry Michaels) 
Alternative radio production

Apples Daycare
Principal: Rashid (née Ray) Patch served as front man for a gang of 4-year-olds. Operating from 6:00am till 7:30pm, Monday through Friday, Apples Daycare was situated on the fourth floor, at the south corner of the building. Six to a dozen of the 15-18 enrolled pre-schoolers came each day. Setting off on foot they explored San Francisco: riding buses, walking neighborhoods, watching parades, attending free concerts in the parks and free movies at the library, attending public presentations of spiritual leaders and teachers. The kids met a bunch of Buddhist abbots, rinpoches, lamas, roshis, Sikh gurus, Taoist priests, kung-fu masters, archbishops, swamis, Orthodox monks, friars, rabbis, and Sufi shaykhs; all of whom would find time to give the kids their blessings.

The parents were artists, exotic dancers, actors, rock&roll musicians, political activists, techies, nurses, social workers, a park ranger - all childcare early-adapters, most screened and referred by the San Francisco Childcare Switchboard.

Blossom Family Studios
Principals: David, Nancy and daughter Annie Blossom
Blossom Studios was a rehearsal space and recording studio for the Blossoms and other musicians. The Blossom's were part of the original Fifty Foot Hose and the band for the touring production of Hair.

Body Politic
The journal of the Medical Committee for Human Rights, Body Politic was originally edited by Dr.Larry Brilliant While based in Project One, Body Politic was edited by John Lowry.

db Associates
Principals:  Peter de Blanc, Liz Barto, Dennis Rice, Steve Sultan, Jeff Neiman, Ray Patch, John Halpern, Vana Veness

DB Associates, located in the basement of Project One, was the successor to Tomorrow, Inc., which had originally been incorporated in Chicago in 1968; most of the team had worked together since 1967. As Tomorrow, Inc., the crew had designed and built nightclubs and discothèques, high-tech light-shows, custom film and projection systems, special-effects lighting systems, recording studios, radio studios, and produced concerts and music festivals. DB Associates designed and built custom electronics, sound and lighting systems, amplifiers, mixers, specialized custom computer and communications equipment. A typical project was the Electric Symphony Orchestra, where a small 40-piece classical orchestra had pickups attached non-destructively to every instrument. All the sound signals from each instrument source were run through custom designed delay and phase shift circuitry, and then through a multi-channel mixer, so that the stereo signal for each single instrument was multiplied, and also separated in space. So, for example, one violin at a single location would be heard as 4, 6, or 8 violins, all with slightly different timbre, in different physical locations in an orchestral section.

Ecology Center Press
Principal: Raymond Baltar, Sr., a printer and founder of the Ecology Center. and International Bird Rescue.

ECOS
Founded 1971. Principals: Ralph Scott, Ray Krauss, Mya Shone, Mary Janowitz, Sherry Reson, Craig Mosher, Andy Bucchiere

Eric Dollard Labs
Principal: Eric Dollard

Located in the basement of Project One, electrical engineer Eric P. Dollard conducted research in ultra-high-voltage electrical and electronics devices. Dollard was systematically reconstructing some of the systems and techniques originally developed by Nikola Tesla and Philo Farnsworth in the early 20th century. At Project One, Dollard had been able to repeatably produce stable "ball lightning" effects using high-voltage plasmas.

Fort Help
The first San Francisco Methadone clinic, Fort Help, founded by Dr. Joel Fort.

Imageworks Film Processing
Principals: Jeff Neiman, Albert Neiman. From Albert's 2020 obituary: "In 1970, Albert became one of the original members of Project One, a unique urban collective located in an old candy factory South of Market. Here he established Image Works, a motion picture lab that supported the independent and student film community."

KPOO Community Radio
An alternative music and news radio station

Optic Nerve
Principals: Lynn Adler, Sherrie Rabinowitz, Jules Backus, Jim Mayer, Bill Bradbury, Ben Tarcher
Founded in 1970 as a photography collective focusing on social issues and American culture, in 1972 Optic Nerve began working in video as well as photography. Their first production was an hour documentary about Project One.

Optic Nerve’s early video documentaries explored rodeos, beauty pageants and the world of owner operator truck drivers.. These were among the first independently produced video documentaries to be broadcast on Public Television. They collaborated with local artists groups such as Ant Farm.

In 1973, the collective moved around the corner from Project One into an undeveloped loft space. The Optic Nerve studio became an important venue in San Francisco's alternative media community, hosting public video screenings, performances, video shoots, and some very good parties. In 1980, three past members formed Ideas In Motion as a for-profit partnership continuing the ideals of Optic Nerve within a sustainable financial structure.

Resource One
Conceived by Pam Hardt as a people's computer center and operating with a donated XDS-940 mainframe computer from TransAmerica Corporation, Resource One became the first public computerized bulletin board system (bbs).

Principals: Sharon Altus, Bart Berger, Mike Chadwick, John Cooney, Lee Felsenstein, Henry the Fiddler, Pam Hardt, Bob Hemmer, Efrem Lipkin,  Chris Macie, Gary McCue, Chris Neustrup, Jed Riffe, Steve Robinson, Ford Turping, Paul Ward, Fred Wright.

Community Memory
Created in 1973 by Lee Felsenstein, Efrem Lipkin, Ken Colstad, Jude Milhon, and Mark Szpakowski, Community Memory was the first public computerized bulletin board system.  One of Community Memory's founders Lee Felsenstein went on to play a central role in the development of the personal computer.

Social Services Referral Directory
Prior to the publication and distribution of the Social Service Referral Directory, social workers and other staff in San Francisco's many agencies relied on personal rolodexes, pamphlets and lists in order to refer their clients for additional and appropriate services. Critical information within agencies changed frequently and successful referrals required up to date and complete information. The idea that a solution utilizing the Resource One computer was possible came from Charles Bolton.

A design, development and implementation team at Resource One (Mary Janowitz, Chris Macie, Sherry Reson, Mya Shone) utilized their donated SDS 940 mainframe computer, programmed by Chris Macie to handle information storage and retrieval. A standardized format and data collection process resulted in agency listings printed on three-hole punch paper. Loose-leaf binders were distributed to the participating agencies, who paid a nominal fee to be mailed a monthly packet including ten new listings and ten to twenty revised listings.

While some agency people sent in information as programs or capacities or locations changed, maintaining current information  and adding listings  depended on project staff making direct telephone contact with agency personnel. Listings were sorted alphabetically behind tabs and index pages provided an overview regarding neighborhoods, languages spoken, types of service and other critical criteria.

Joan Lefkowitz joined the team early in 1974, then Katerina Lanner-Cusin came on board. The following year, a conversation with The United Way of the Bay Area, and the heads of San Francisco Social Services and the Zellerbach Family Fund, resulted in the United Way assuming responsibility. In the summer of 1994, the United Way determined they were unable to maintain the service. The San Francisco Public Library (SFPL) took over and renamed it the San Francisco Community Services Directory aka Community Services Data Base. SFPL maintained it as an online database through spring of 2009. Sometime in the ‘90s the library decided it was duplicative of other, mainly web-based, resources and discontinued it. People in the social services world wish it still existed and Lefkowitz, then the Library's Web Service Manager, commented that the SSRD represented a "ground breaking use of technology."

The San Francisco School of Holography
Lloyd Cross, Jerry Pethick

San Francisco Switchboard
Founded by Al Rinker, San Francisco Switchboard was an outgrowth of the Haight-Ashbury Switchboard. SF Switchboard relocated to Project One in 1970.

1971 San Francisco Bay oil spill
In January, The Ecology Center Press, Resource One and Symbas School combined forces with the San Francisco Switchboard to coordinate communications among volunteers and organizational responses to the clean-up effort. Records kept by Public Television station KQED were subsequently destroyed. Then a Symbas student, Ray Baltar, Jr., whose father ran the Ecology Center Press, wrote of his experience "as part of a school work experience project I had scored a job as an operator for the San Francisco Switchboard on an old PBX machine, also in the building, when I started getting calls about an oil spill in San Francisco Bay caused by two Standard Oil tankers that had collided. Thousands of people wanted to know if and where they could volunteer to help rescue birds and clean the beaches, and over the next several weeks almost everyone in the building helped to build an old-­‐school information hub, complete with a phone bank, whiteboards and rumor control. We coordinated with other volunteer hubs that had sprung up in Marin County, Half Moon Bay and elsewhere to try and manage the volunteer effort, and though most of the birds died, the beaches did eventually get cleaned and the effort spawned the International Bird Rescue group that has responded to many subsequent spills and has learned how to save much more wildlife."

San Francisco Vietnam Veterans Against the War - VVAW 
In 1967, Vietnam Veterans Against the War (VVAW) was founded in New York City after six Vietnam vets marched together in a peace demonstration. The VVAW San Francisco Chapter was one of the early groups in Project One, organizing against the Vietnam war, and counseling and assisting their fellow veterans.

Principals: Lee Thorn, Mike Oliver, Jack McCloskey, Jim O'Donnell, Bob Hanson, Paul Cox, and Mike Oliver.

Symbas Alternative High School
(to be added)

Media
An hour-long documentary on Project One by Optic Nerve

References

External links
 Thomas Albright San Francisco Chronicle A Unique Coop of Talent
 The American Hippies by W. J. Rorabaugh
 What the Dormouse Said: How the Sixties Counterculture Shaped the Personal Computer Industry by John Markoff
 Photography Review: In Paris, Stencil Artists Talk to the Walls, and Their Work Is Washed Away | Margarett Loke reviews Jules Backus
 Rolling Stone: S P A C E W A R Fanatic Life and Symbolic Death Among the Computer Bums | Stewart Brand 1972

Artist colonies
American artist groups and collectives
Counterculture communities
Hippie movement
Intentional communities in California